Cusihuiriachi is one of the 67 municipalities of Chihuahua, in northern Mexico. The municipal seat lies at Cusihuiriachi. The municipality covers an area of 1,810.3 km².

As of 2010, the municipality had a total population of 5,414 inhabitants. Cusihuiriachi Municipality has the distinction of having the smallest municipal seat in Mexico relative to its municipal population. Its municipal seat had an official population of 63 inhabitants, which accounted for only 1.164 percent of the municipality's population. (There are three municipal seats that are less populous, Santa María del Rosario, Santa María Nduayaco, and Santa Cruz Tayata, all in the State of Oaxaca, but their municipalities are also much less populous than Cusihuiriachi.)

Geography

Towns and villages
The largest localities (all rural) are listed below. Note that the only urban locality, the municipal seat, Cusihuiriachi, with a population of 63 inhabitants, is not among them.

References

Municipalities of Chihuahua (state)